Mystique Valley is a Malaysian period drama television series produced by Double Vision and ntv7. The series premiered on 9 November 2010 on Malaysian television and currently airs every Monday to Thursday at 10:00pm on Malaysia's ntv7.

Synopsis
In this 30 episode drama, Jess Teong plays He Can Qing, a woman who returns to her hometown after spending years abroad in Australia. Her brother, He Zhong Xiong, the only son in the family, struggles to keep up with his mother's (Zhang Jin Yan, portrayed by Susan Leong) high expectations. Can Qing's uncle, He Xin Quan, plans to cheat the He family out of their fortune. Meanwhile, Auntie Tao wants her daughter, Shu Mei, to marry Zhong Xiong so they can enjoy a better life. Lin Ke Qiu, Zhong Xiong's lover, appears mysteriously after having disappeared for 20 years. As the plot unravels, Can Qing discovers some truths that change everyone's life. Now, Can Qing must think of a way to save the He family from the clutches of her uncle. Making matters worse, Auntie Tao is seeking revenge from the family for causing her daughter's death. Will Can Qing succeed in saving the He family?

Cast

External links
 Series opening sequence on YouTube
 Mystique Valley catch-up TV

References

Chinese-language drama television series in Malaysia
2010 Malaysian television series debuts
2010 Malaysian television series endings
NTV7 original programming